Andriy Fedorenko (born 9 January 1984) is a former Ukrainian footballer.

Career
Fedorenko, started his career in youth career in Yunist Chernihiv and in Akademika Moscow.
 Then he played for the reserve side of FC Shinnik Yaroslavl before joining Ukrainian First League side FC Stal Dniprodzerzhynsk.

After retirement
In 2020 he was appointed as goalkeepers coach of Kolos Kovalivka U21.

Outside of professional football
In March 2022, during the Siege of Chernihiv, Andriy Fedorenko and others players, provided money for the needs of the Armed Forces to defend the city of Chernihiv.

Honours
Umeå
 Division 1: 2019

Desna Chernihiv
 Ukrainian Second League: 2012–13

Dinamo București II
Liga III: 2006–07

References

External links

Andriy Fedorenko at Footballdatabase

1984 births
Living people
Footballers from Chernihiv
Ukrainian footballers
Association football goalkeepers
Ukrainian expatriate footballers
Expatriate footballers in Russia
Expatriate footballers in Kazakhstan
Expatriate footballers in Romania
Expatriate footballers in Sweden
Expatriate footballers in Belarus
Expatriate footballers in Latvia
Ukrainian Premier League players
Ukrainian expatriate sportspeople in Russia
Ukrainian expatriate sportspeople in Kazakhstan
Ukrainian expatriate sportspeople in Romania
Ukrainian expatriate sportspeople in Sweden
Ukrainian expatriate sportspeople in Belarus
Ukrainian expatriate sportspeople in Latvia
Liga I players
FC Shinnik Yaroslavl players
FC Stal Kamianske players
FC Nafkom Brovary players
FC Atyrau players
CSM Ceahlăul Piatra Neamț players
FC Dinamo București players
FC Desna Chernihiv players
FC Desna-2 Chernihiv players
FC Yunist Chernihiv players
FC Kryvbas Kryvyi Rih players
FC Krumkachy Minsk players
FC Chornomorets Odesa players
Umeå FC players
Valmieras FK players
FC Podillya Khmelnytskyi players